USS LST-907 was an  in the United States Navy. Like many of her class, she was not named and is properly referred to by her hull designation.

Construction
LST-907 was laid down on 31 January 1944, at Hingham, Massachusetts, by the Bethlehem-Hingham Shipyard; launched on 18 March 1944; sponsored by Miss Rosemary Leonard; and commissioned on 30 April 1944.

Service history
During World War II, LST-907 was assigned to the European Theatre and participated in the invasion of southern France in September 1944.

She was decommissioned on 18 October 1946. On 25 November 1946, the ship was delivered to and commissioned in the Venezuelan Navy and struck from the Navy list that same date.

She was renamed Capana and served until 1957 as a training ship.

Awards
LST-907 earned one battle star for World War II service.

Notes

Citations

Bibliography 

Online resources

External links
 

 

LST-542-class tank landing ships
World War II amphibious warfare vessels of the United States
Ships built in Hingham, Massachusetts
1944 ships
Ships transferred from the United States Navy to the Bolivarian Navy of Venezuela